Thomas Papa Jr. (born November 10, 1968) is an American comedian, actor, and radio host. He hosts the Sirius XM Satellite Radio show Come to Papa and, in July 2019, he and Fortune Feimster started hosting the Sirius XM show What a Joke with Papa and Fortune. Papa hosted the show Baked on the Food Network and was the head writer and a performer on the radio variety show Live from Here, hosted by Chris Thile, where he delivered the "Out In America" segment.

Early life
Papa was born in Passaic, New Jersey, and grew up in Park Ridge, New Jersey, and later Woodcliff Lake, New Jersey, where he graduated from Pascack Hills High School in 1986. He is a graduate of Rider College. He has two daughters, and a sister who works at the non-profit organization, City Green. Papa is noted to have played football and track while younger.

Career

Stand-up comedy
He began in New York City in 1993 playing open mics and hosting at the Stand Up New York comedy club. He toured with Jerry Seinfeld after meeting him at the Comedy Cellar in New York. In 2005 he released his debut comedy album Calm, Cool, & Collected. His successful one-man show Only Human opened at the Montreal Just for Laughs Comedy Festival.

He has recorded five stand-up specials. Live in New York City and Freaked Out were directed by Rob Zombie. His fourth special, Human Mule, aired December 2016. All of his specials stream on Hulu, Amazon and Netflix.  Papa has appeared multiple times on The Tonight Show with Jay Leno, Late Show with David Letterman, and The Joe Rogan Experience.

Papa's catchphrase is "Have you ever...?  I have!"

Radio
Papa hosts the Sirius XM Satellite Radio show Come to Papa, with other comedians occasionally serving as guest hosts. In July 2019, Papa and Fortune Feimster started hosting What a Joke with Papa and Fortune, interviewing comedians and other celebrities, the first live programming on the Sirius XM station Netflix is a Joke.

Papa writes and performs the monthly Come to Papa Live, a version of a classic radio play combined with standup, music, and sketches. Come to Papa Live is alternately hosted between The Village Underground in New York and Largo in Los Angeles. Guests on Come to Papa Live have included Matt Damon, Sarah Silverman, Joel McHale, Andy Richter, and Jim Gaffigan. Tom first appeared as a panelist on NPR's Wait, Wait...Don't tell Me on June 30, 2018. He appeared as the guest for The Official Podcast on YouTube on August 30, 2018. After Chris Thile took over A Prairie Home Companion from Garrison Keillor, Papa was a key contributor to the show, now re-named Live From Here, that included the regular segment "Out in America with Tom Papa". He worked behind the scenes as head writer.

TV and film
Papa had a recurring role as Luff in the HBO and Cinemax series The Knick, starring Clive Owen. He appeared in Chris Rock's movie Top Five, and starred as Ray Arnett alongside Michael Douglas and Matt Damon in Behind the Candelabra, which aired on HBO on May 26, 2013. That was his second film with director Steven Soderbergh.

Papa played opposite Matt Damon in Steven Soderbergh's 2009 film The Informant!. He also played the title character of El Superbeasto and starred opposite Paul Giamatti in the Rob Zombie animated feature The Haunted World of El Superbeasto. He played himself in Comedian, and lent his voice to the animated feature Bee Movie.

In 2010, Papa hosted NBC's The Marriage Ref, which ran for two seasons.

Papa's other TV appearances include Inside Amy Schumer, The Jim Gaffigan Show, a recurring role on The New Adventures of Old Christine,  hosting the FOX show Boom! which aired in summer 2015, VH1's I Love the '70s, I Love the '80s, and I Love the '90s series, National Geographic Channel's US version of the British game show Duck Quacks Don't Echo.

In 2020, Papa appeared in an hour long comedy special for Netflix entitled You're Doing Great! and published a book of the same name.

Filmography

Film
Analyze That (2002)
Comedian (2002)
The Life Coach (2005)
Bee Movie (2007)
The Haunted World of El Superbeasto (2009) (also writer) 
The Informant! (2009)
Behind the Candelabra (2013)
Top Five (2014)
3 from Hell (2019)
Paper Spiders (2021)
Air (2023)

TV
Comedy Central Presents (2001 and 2007)
Tough Crowd with Colin Quinn (Unknown episodes, 2002)
Come to Papa (4 episodes, 2004)
The New Adventures of Old Christine (2 episodes, 2008)
The Marriage Ref (2010)
The Tonight Show with Jay Leno
The Nightly Show with Larry Wilmore
Late Night with David Letterman
Late Night with Conan O'Brien
Jimmy Kimmel Live!
Behind the Candelabra (2013)
Duck Quacks Don't Echo (2014)
Human Mule (EPIX special) (2016)
Tosh 2.0 (2016)
Inside Amy Schumer (2015)
The Jim Gaffigan Show (2015)
The Knick (US TV series) (2014–)
Boom! (2015)
The Late Show with Stephen Colbert (2016)
Baked with Tom Papa (2018–)
You're Doing Great! (Netflix special) (2020)
What A Day! (Netflix special) (2022)

Podcasts
Breaking Bread with Tom Papa (2020-)
Come To Papa (2013–2020)
The Official Podcast (2018)

Specials
Calm, Cool, & Collected (BSeenMedia, 2005)
Tom Papa: Live in New York City (Comedy Central Records, 2012)
Freaked Out (2013)
Human Mule (2016)
You're Doing Great! (2020)What A Day! (2022)''

References

External links
Official site

1968 births
Living people
20th-century American comedians
21st-century American comedians
21st-century American male actors
American game show hosts
American male comedians
American male film actors
American male television actors
American stand-up comedians
Pascack Hills High School alumni
People from Park Ridge, New Jersey
Writers from Passaic, New Jersey
People from Woodcliff Lake, New Jersey
Male actors from New Jersey
American television writers
American male television writers
Rider University alumni
American radio personalities
American writers of Italian descent
Comedians from New Jersey
Screenwriters from New Jersey
American radio writers
Television producers from New Jersey